Photoacoustic spectroscopy is the measurement of the effect of absorbed electromagnetic energy (particularly of light) on matter by means of acoustic detection. The discovery of the photoacoustic effect dates to 1880 when Alexander Graham Bell showed that thin discs emitted sound when exposed to a beam of sunlight that was rapidly interrupted with a rotating slotted disk. The absorbed energy from the light causes local heating, generating a thermal expansion which creates a pressure wave or sound. Later Bell showed that materials exposed to the non-visible portions of the solar spectrum (i.e., the infrared and the ultraviolet) can also produce sounds.

A photoacoustic spectrum of a sample can be recorded by measuring the sound at different wavelengths of the light. This spectrum can be used to identify the absorbing components of the sample. The photoacoustic effect can be used to study solids, liquids and gases.

Uses and techniques

Photoacoustic spectroscopy has become a powerful technique to study concentrations of gases at the part per billion or even part per trillion levels. Modern photoacoustic detectors still rely on the same principles as Bell's apparatus; however, to increase the sensitivity, several modifications have been made.
 
Instead of sunlight, intense lasers are used to illuminate the sample since the intensity of the generated sound is proportional to the light intensity; this technique is referred to as laser photoacoustic spectroscopy (LPAS). The ear has been replaced by sensitive microphones. The microphone signals are further amplified and detected using lock-in amplifiers. By enclosing the gaseous sample in a cylindrical chamber, the sound signal is amplified by tuning the modulation frequency to an acoustic resonance of the sample cell.

By using cantilever enhanced photoacoustic spectroscopy sensitivity can still be further improved enabling reliable monitoring of gases on ppb-level.

Example
The following example illustrates the potential of the photoacoustic technique: In the early 1970s, Patel and co-workers  measured the temporal variation of the concentration of nitric oxide in the stratosphere at an altitude of 28 km with a balloon-borne photoacoustic detector. These measurements provided crucial data bearing on the problem of ozone depletion by man-made nitric oxide emission. Some of the early work relied on development of the RG theory by Rosencwaig and Gersho.

Applications
One of the important capabilities of using FTIR photoacoustic spectroscopy has been the ability to evaluate samples in their in situ state by infrared spectroscopy, which can be used to detect and quantify chemical functional groups and thus chemical substances. This is particularly useful for biological samples that can be evaluated without crushing to powder or subjecting to chemical treatments. Seashells, bone and such samples have been investigated. Using photoacoustic spectroscopy has helped evaluate molecular interactions in bone with osteogenesis imperfecta .

While most academic research has concentrated on high resolution instruments, some work has gone in the opposite direction. In the last twenty years, very low cost instruments for applications such as leakage detection and for the control of carbon dioxide concentration have been developed and commercialized. Typically, low cost thermal sources are used which are modulated electronically. Diffusion through semi-permeable disks instead of valves for gas exchange, low-cost microphones, and proprietary signal processing with digital signal processors have brought down the costs of these systems. The future of low-cost applications of photoacoustic spectroscopy may be the realization of fully integrated micromachined photoacoustic instruments.

The photoacoustic approach has been utilized to quantitatively measure macromolecules, such as proteins. The photoacoustic immunoassay labels and detects target proteins using nanoparticles that can generate strong acoustic signals. The photoacoustics-based protein analysis has also been applied for point-of-care testings.

Photoacoustic spectroscopy also has many military applications. One such application is the detection toxic chemical agents. The sensitivity of photoacoustic spectroscopy makes it an ideal analysis technique for detecting trace chemicals associated with chemical attacks.

LPAS sensors may be applied in industry, security (nerve agent and explosives detection), and medicine (breath analysis).

References

Further reading
 Sigrist, M. W. (1994), "Air Monitoring by Laser Photoacoustic Spectroscopy," in: Sigrist, M. W. (editor), "Air Monitoring by Spectroscopic Techniques," Wiley, New York, pp. 163–238.

External links
 General introduction to photoacoustic spectroscopy: 
 Photoacoustic spectroscopy in trace gas monitoring 
 Photoacoustic spectrometer for trace gas detection based on a Helmholtz Resonant Cell (www.aerovia.fr) 
 Photoacoustic multi-gas monitor for trace gas detection based on cantilever enhanced photoacoustic spectroscopy (www.gasera.fi)

Spectroscopy